Multi-task optimization is a paradigm in the optimization literature that focuses on solving multiple  self-contained tasks simultaneously.  The paradigm has been inspired by the well-established concepts of transfer learning and multi-task learning in predictive analytics.

The key motivation behind multi-task optimization is that if optimization tasks are related to each other in terms of their optimal solutions or the general characteristics of their function landscapes, the search progress can be transferred to substantially accelerate the search on the other.

The success of the paradigm is not necessarily limited to one-way knowledge transfers from simpler to more complex tasks. In practice an attempt is to intentionally solve a more difficult task that may unintentionally solve several smaller problems.

Methods

There are several common approaches for multi-task optimization: Bayesian optimization,  evolutionary computation, and approaches based on Game theory.

Multi-task Bayesian optimization 
Multi-task Bayesian optimization is a modern model-based approach that leverages the concept of knowledge transfer to speed up the automatic hyperparameter optimization process of machine learning algorithms. The method builds a multi-task Gaussian process model on the data originating from different searches progressing in tandem. The captured inter-task dependencies are thereafter utilized to better inform the subsequent sampling of candidate solutions in respective search spaces.

Evolutionary multi-tasking 
Evolutionary multi-tasking has been explored as a means of exploiting the implicit parallelism of population-based search algorithms to simultaneously progress multiple distinct optimization tasks. By mapping all tasks to a unified search space, the evolving population of candidate solutions can harness the hidden relationships between them through continuous genetic transfer. This is induced when solutions associated with different tasks crossover. Recently, modes of knowledge transfer that are different from direct solution crossover have been explored.

Game-theoretic optimization 
Game-theoretic approaches to multi-task optimization propose to view the optimization problem as a game, where each task is a player. All players compete through the reward matrix of the game, and try to reach a solution that satisfies all players (all tasks). This view provide insight about how to build efficient algorithms based on gradient descent optimization (GD), which is particularly important for training deep neural networks.  In GD for MTL, the problem is that each task provides its own loss, and it is not clear how to combine all losses and create a single unified gradient, leading to several different aggregation strategies. This aggregation problem can be solved by defining a game matrix where the reward of each player is the agreement of its own gradient with the common gradient, and then setting the common gradient to be the Nash Cooperative bargaining of that system.

Applications 

Algorithms for multi-task optimization span a wide array of real-world applications. Recent studies highlight the potential for speed-ups in the optimization of engineering design parameters by conducting related designs jointly in a multi-task manner. In machine learning, the transfer of optimized features across related data sets can enhance the efficiency of the training process as well as improve the generalization capability of learned models. In addition, the concept of multi-tasking has led to advances in automatic hyperparameter optimization of machine learning models and ensemble learning.

Applications have also been reported in cloud computing, with future developments geared towards cloud-based on-demand optimization services that can cater to multiple customers simultaneously. Recent work has additionally shown applications in chemistry.

See also
 Multi-objective optimization
 Multi-task learning
 Multicriteria classification
 Multiple-criteria decision analysis

References

Machine learning